Herman E. Laverdière (13 March 1927 – 21 May 2001) was a Liberal party member of the House of Commons of Canada. Born in Saint-Lazare, Quebec, he was a teacher by career.

He was first elected at the Bellechasse riding in the 1963 general election and re-elected there in 1965. After completing his second term, the 27th Canadian Parliament, Laverdière left Parliament and did not campaign in further federal elections.

External links
 
Herman Laverdière's obituary 

1927 births
2001 deaths
Members of the House of Commons of Canada from Quebec
Liberal Party of Canada MPs